Handball at the Islamic Solidarity Games was introduced for men at the first edition in 2005 Islamic Solidarity Games held in Mecca. Women's handball competition was introduced at the fourth edition of 2017 Islamic Solidarity Games held in Baku.

Men

Summary

Medal table

Participating nations

 – Champions
 – Runners-up
 – Third place
4th – Fourth place
QF – Quarterfinals
GS – Group stage
 — Hosts

Women

Summary

Medal table

Participating nations

 – Champions
 – Runners-up
 – Third place
4th – Fourth place
QF – Quarterfinals
GS – Group stage
 — Hosts

Note

External links
Goalzz

 
Islamic Solidarity Games